Elena Berlato (born 2 August 1988) is an Italian professional racing cyclist.

See also
 2014 Alé Cipollini season

References

External links
 

1988 births
Living people
Italian female cyclists
Cyclists from the Province of Vicenza
People from Schio